Pasiphila nebulosa is a moth in the family Geometridae. It is found in New Zealand.

References

Moths described in 1971
nebulosa
Moths of New Zealand
Endemic fauna of New Zealand
Endemic moths of New Zealand